Purplish Rain is a compilation of Prince covers released by Spin magazine for readers of its July 2009 issue. The album contains cover versions of songs from Prince's 1984 Purple Rain album, in the same track order as the original, on the occasion of the album's 25th anniversary.

It was not a physical album and was available in its digital format up to September 30, 2009.  The album cover features text in much the same font as the Purple Rain album, but with a drop of water added.

Track listing
 "Let's Go Crazy" (Performed by Riverboat Gamblers) - 4:16
 "Take Me with U" (Performed by Sharon Jones & The Dap-Kings) - 2:57
 "The Beautiful Ones" (Performed by Fol Chen) - 5:01
 "Computer Blue" (Performed by of Montreal) - 3:14
 "Darling Nikki" (Performed by Chairlift) - 5:19
 "When Doves Cry" (Performed by The Twilight Singers) - 4:30
 "I Would Die 4 U" (Performed by Mariachi El Bronx) - 3:24
 "Baby I'm a Star" (Performed by Craig Wedren) - 4:07
 "Purple Rain" (Performed by Lavender Diamond) - 4:36

References

2009 compilation albums
Prince (musician) tribute albums
Compilation albums included with magazines